Michael Mullane (13 April 1889 – 22 November 1962) was an Irish hurler who played as a left wing-forward for the Limerick senior team.

Born in Croom, County Limerick, Mullane first arrived on the inter-county scene at the age of thirty when he first linked up with the Limerick senior team. Mullane went on to play a key part for Limerick during a golden age for the team, and won one All-Ireland medal and one Munster medal.

At club level Mullane won two championship medals with Croom.

Honours

Team

Young Irelands
Limerick Senior Hurling Championship (2): 1919, 1924

Limerick
All-Ireland Senior Hurling Championship (1): 1921
Munster Senior Hurling Championship (1): 1921

References

1889 births
1962 deaths
Croom hurlers
Limerick inter-county hurlers
All-Ireland Senior Hurling Championship winners